Zinedine Bensalem (born 25 May 1990) is an Algerian football player. He currently plays for DRB Tadjenanet in the Algerian Ligue 2.

References

External links
 

1990 births
Living people
Algerian footballers
Algeria under-23 international footballers
MC Alger players
Algerian Ligue Professionnelle 1 players
Algeria youth international footballers
RC Arbaâ players
Association football forwards
21st-century Algerian people